= Shahrestan Adab =

- Status: Active
- Founded: 2010; 16 years ago
- Country of origin: Iran
- Headquarters location: Tehran, Iran
- Distribution: Iran
- Publication types: Books
- Official website: shahrestanadab.com

Shahrestan Adab (Persian: شهرستان ادب, established 2010) is an Iranian publishing house which mainly focuses on publishing collections of poems, novels and books of literary criticism.

== Awards ==
In 2014, Shahrestan Adab has been awarded Iran's Publisher of the Year by President Hassan Rouhani.
